Sinqa (Quechua for "nose", Hispanicized spelling Sencca, also Senqa) is a  mountain in the Andes of Peru northwest of the city of Cusco. It lies in the Cusco Region, Cusco Province, Cusco District, and in the Anta Province, Cachimayo District.

Like Pachatusan, Pillku Urqu and Wanakawri, Sinqa is one of the mountains in the vicinity of Cusco which have been venerated as apus (sacred mountains).

Gallery

See also 
 Anawarkhi
 Araway Qhata
 Muyu Urqu
 Pikchu

References

Mountains of Peru
Mountains of Cusco Region